is a railway station located in Onnenai (恩根内), Bifuka, Nakagawa District (Teshio), Hokkaidō prefecture, and is operated by the Hokkaido Railway Company.

Lines serviced
 Hokkaido Railway Company
 Sōya Main Line

Adjacent stations

Railway stations in Hokkaido Prefecture
Railway stations in Japan opened in 1911